The seventh and final season of the American ABC fantasy-drama series Once Upon a Time was ordered on May 11, 2017. It premiered on October 6, 2017, and consisted of 22 episodes, having aired on Fridays instead of Sundays in prior seasons.

This season marked a significant change for the series, as it was announced at the end of the sixth season that the majority of the main cast members would not be returning in such capacity for season 7. Lana Parrilla, Colin O'Donoghue and Robert Carlyle were the only ones remaining, while Rebecca Mader and Jared S. Gilmore returned in recurring capacities. Andrew J. West and Alison Fernandez were announced as new regulars in May 2017. Dania Ramirez and Gabrielle Anwar were announced as additional regulars in July 2017. In August 2017, it was announced that Mekia Cox had been promoted to series regular after initially joining the cast in July as recurring.

The storyline was softly rebooted with a main narrative led by an adult Henry Mills, set several years after last season's events. In February 2018, it was announced the seventh season would serve as the final season of the series; the season and series concluded on May 18, 2018.

Existing fictional characters introduced to the series during the season include Tiana, Mother Gothel, Eudora, Dr. Facilier, Prince Naveen, Madame Leota, and Captain Ahab. The season also introduced new iterations of various characters from earlier seasons, including Cinderella, Lady Tremaine, Drizella, Anastasia, Rapunzel, Jack, Hansel, Gretel, the Blind Witch, as well as Alice, who previously appeared in Once Upon a Time in Wonderland.

Premise
Several years after the Final Battle, Henry Mills leaves Storybrooke in search of his own story, only to find himself in the New Enchanted Forest, where a conflict among its inhabitants culminates in the casting of a new curse that sends the New Enchanted Forest inhabitants to a Seattle neighborhood known as "Hyperion Heights" - and back to the past, before Henry left Storybrooke. As Henry's daughter Lucy sets out to restore his belief, Mother Gothel seeks to reclaim her former home by using her Coven of the Eight while avoiding Dr. Facilier and a vengeful witch hunter. The eventual breaking of the curse leads to the arrival of the Wish Realm version of Rumplestiltskin, who seeks to destroy everyone’s happiness. His defeat leads Regina to recast the Dark Curse one last time, which merges all the realms of story into one: the United Realms.

Cast and characters

Main
 Lana Parrilla as the Evil Queen / Regina Mills / Roni
 Colin O'Donoghue as Captain Hook / Killian Jones / Rogers
 Andrew J. West as Henry Mills
 Dania Ramirez as Cinderella / Jacinda Vidrio
 Gabrielle Anwar as Rapunzel / Lady Tremaine / Victoria Belfrey
 Alison Fernandez as Lucy Mills / Lucy Vidrio
 Robert Carlyle as Rumplestiltskin / Mr. Gold / Weaver
 Mekia Cox as Tiana / Sabine

Recurring

 Jared S. Gilmore as young Henry Mills / Sir Henry
 Adelaide Kane as Drizella / Ivy Belfrey
 Rose Reynolds as Alice / Tilly
 Bruce Blain as Samuel B. Ryce / Desk Sergeant
 Trevor Roberts as Remy
 Emma Booth as Mother Gothel / Mother Nature / Eloise Gardener
 Chris Gauthier as Smee
 Rebecca Mader as the Wicked Witch of the West / Zelena / Kelly West
 Daniel Francis as Dr. Facilier / Mr. Baron Samdi
 Robin Givens as Eudora
 Meegan Warner as young Rapunzel / Lady Tremaine
 Tiera Skovbye as Robin Hood / Margot
 Nathan Parsons as Hansel / Jack / Nick Branson
 Yael Yurman as Anastasia
 Jeff Pierre as Prince Naveen / Drew
 Chilton Crane as the Blind Witch / Hilda Braeburn

Guest

 Jillian Fargey as the Fairy Godmother
 Liam Hall as the Prince
 Jennifer Morrison as Emma Swan
 Emilie de Ravin as Belle
 Giles Matthey as Gideon
 Kevin Ryan as Robert
 Matty Finochio as Marcus Tremaine
 Cindy Luna as Cecelia
 Anna Cathcart as teenage Drizella
 Lula Mae Melench as young Drizella
 Alejandra Perez as young Ella
 Sophia Reid-Gantzert as young Anastasia
 Sara Tomko as Tiger Lily
 Suzy Joachim as Madame Leota
 Nisreen Slim as the Hedge Witch / Dr. Andrea Sage
 Chad Rook as Captain Ahab
 Elle McKinnon as young Alice
 Charles Mesure as Blackbeard (Wish Realm)
 Kip Pardue as Chad
 Dan Payne as Ivo
 Seth Isaac Johnson as young Hansel
 Sara Canning as Gretel
 Lily van der Griend as young Gretel
 Kyra Leroux as Yarrow
 Emily Tennant as Isla
 Naika Toussaint as Seraphina
 Gabrielle Miller as Mother Flora
 Beverley Elliott as Widow Lucas / Granny
 Robbie Kay as Malcolm / Peter Pan (Wish Realm)
 Victoria Smurfit as Cruella De Vil (Wish Realm)
 JoAnna Garcia Swisher as Ariel (Wish Realm)
 Timothy Webber as the Apprentice (Wish Realm)
 Ginnifer Goodwin as Snow White / Mary Margaret Blanchard
 Josh Dallas as Prince Charming / David Nolan
 Sean Maguire as Robin Hood
 Tony Amendola as Geppetto / Marco
 Lee Arenberg as Grumpy / Leroy
 Jack Davies as Pinocchio
 Faustino Di Bauda as Sleepy / Walter
 Gabe Khouth as Sneezy / Mr. Clark
 Keegan Connor Tracy as the Blue Fairy / Mother Superior
 Raphael Sbarge as Jiminy Cricket / Dr. Archie Hopper
 David Paul Grove as Doc

Episodes

Production

Development
In January 2017, while season 6 was still in production, ABC president Channing Dungey spoke of a possible "reset" of the show's narrative in the event that the show received a season 7 order. After much speculation, executive producers Adam Horowitz and Edward Kitsis later confirmed that certain characters would have their storylines wrapped up and that the back-end of the sixth season had been written with the season 7 narrative change in mind. Despite the major changes from seasons past, the showrunners have said that they do not view season 7 as a complete reboot of the show. Horowitz said: "I hesitate to use the word 'reboot'. We're more thinking about it as a hybrid of a lot of things. We're paying homage to the original premise, but there are certain characters who are returning and some who are not. It's a combination of a lot of things, but what we're trying to do is go in a new direction but stay true to the spirit of what the show has always been."

In July 2017, the creators announced that the season would be set in the fictitious Seattle neighborhood of Hyperion Heights, which was created under a new curse. Residents of this neighborhood included displaced characters from the original and new versions of the Enchanted Forest, as well as regular people from the Land Without Magic. This differs from Storybrooke in the first six seasons, which was an isolated town that was blocked off from real-world Maine. The initial villain is Lady Tremaine, who assumes the role of an urban developer who seeks to "gentrify the neighborhood" and push out and separate fairytale residents. Meanwhile, Storybrooke and various Fairy Tale Land locations still appear in the flashbacks of the season as the story bounces back and forth between the characters' lives before and during the latest curse.

The main flashback setting of the seventh season is the New Enchanted Forest, which is a New Fairy Tale Land realm. Other locations featured in flashbacks are the Edge of Realms, the Wish Realm, the New Wonderland, Oz, and Storybrooke itself.

Casting
In May 2017, it was announced that Lana Parrilla, Colin O'Donoghue, and Robert Carlyle would be the only series regulars from season 6 to continue onto season 7. The character of Henry would also return, but as a man in his late 20s-early 30s portrayed by Andrew J. West. It was teased that the four would be portraying their original characters but with cursed identities, similar to the circumstances in season 1. In July, the first promo of the season revealed that Killian is now a Seattle police officer with the last name Rogers, who is living with an unexplained sense of loss. In August, it was revealed that Regina is now a bar owner named Roni, who is more dressed down and is "no longer in charge."

Former main cast member Jennifer Morrison has confirmed that she has agreed to return for at least one episode, first appearing in the second episode of the season. Morrison announced her last filming day for the episode on July 19, 2017. On July 22, it was confirmed that Emilie de Ravin would return for the fourth episode of the season.

In March 2017, Andrew J. West and Alison Fernandez were cast for unknown guest roles in the season 6 finale. During the episode, it was revealed that West was portraying an adult Henry Mills, while Fernandez portrayed his daughter, Lucy. After that episode's airing, they were confirmed as series regulars for season 7. West took over the role from Jared S. Gilmore, who has been confirmed to appear in at least the first two episodes of the season.

On July 6, 2017, it was announced that Dania Ramirez and Gabrielle Anwar would be two additional series regulars for season 7.  Additionally, Adelaide Kane, Mekia Cox, and Rose Reynolds were cast in recurring roles for the season. On July 15, it was announced that Ramirez would be portraying Cinderella, albeit a different version from the one previously played by Jessy Schram for the first six seasons. On July 22 at San Diego Comic-Con, it was revealed that Anwar and Kane will be portraying Lady Tremaine and Drizella, respectively. Cox would be portraying Tiana from The Princess and the Frog, while Reynolds would be playing an alternate version of Alice, a character previously featured in the spin-off Once Upon a Time in Wonderland. In August 2017, Cox was promoted to series regular status.

On August 1, it was announced that Giles Matthey would return as an adult Gideon for the season's fourth episode. The episode, also featuring de Ravin, would be centered around Rumple. On that same day, it was also announced that Emma Booth was cast in a major recurring role as the Witch, whose more specific identity would be revealed later on during the season. On August 25, Kevin Ryan announced that he would be making an appearance as a new prince in the upcoming season. On August 30, it was announced that Robin Givens had been cast as Tiana's mother, Eudora.

On September 8, it was announced that Meegan Warner would be guest starring as an alternate version of Rapunzel, a character previously featured in the season 3 episode "The Tower". It was later revealed that the character would appear in a multi-episode arc. On September 20, it was announced that former regular Rebecca Mader would return for multiple episodes in the seventh season as Zelena, who would also have a cursed identity.

On October 2, it was announced that Dr. Facilier from The Princess and the Frog would make an appearance during the season, later revealed to be portrayed by Daniel Francis in the season's fifth episode. On October 3, it was announced that flashbacks of the ninth episode would feature a "tweenage" Anastasia, Lady Tremaine's other biological daughter.

On November 1, it was announced that Tiera Skovbye would be recurring as an older version of Robin, the daughter of Zelena and Robin Hood. On November 2, it was announced that Nathan Parsons had been cast in a recurring role as Nick, a lawyer and potential love interest for another character. On November 3, it was announced that the show was casting for the role of Naveen from The Princess and the Frog, who will be recurring in the second half of the season. It was later revealed that the role would be played by Jeff Pierre, who first appeared in the twelfth episode of the season. On November 16, actor Chad Rook announced that he had been cast in an unknown role, later revealed to be Captain Ahab in the thirteenth episode.

On January 23, 2018, it was announced that Kip Pardue had been cast as Chad, Zelena's fiancé from when she was cursed as Kelly. He made his appearance in the seventeenth episode of the season.

On March 16, it was announced that multiple former cast members were set to appear in one or both of the season's (and series') last two episodes. This includes former regulars Gilmore (who had also been confirmed to appear in the twentieth episode) and Sean Maguire, as well as formerly recurring stars JoAnna Garcia Swisher, Victoria Smurfit, Robbie Kay, Beverley Elliott, Lee Arenberg, Keegan Connor Tracy and Tony Amendola. On March 21, it was announced that Morrison and de Ravin would be back for a second time, along with Ginnifer Goodwin and Josh Dallas for the final episode of the series. In addition, Raphael Sbarge, David Paul Grove, and Faustino Di Bauda later confirmed that they were also appearing in the finale.

Ratings

Notes

References

External links
 

2017 American television seasons
2018 American television seasons
Season 7
Fictional portrayals of the Seattle Police Department